The 1861 New York state election was held on November 5, 1861, to elect the Secretary of State, the State Comptroller, the New York State Attorney General, the State Treasurer, the State Engineer, a Judge of the New York Court of Appeals, two Canal Commissioners and an Inspector of State Prisons, as well as all members of the New York State Assembly and the New York State Senate.

History
The "Independent People's" state convention met on September 10 at Syracuse, New York with the intention to nominate a ticket which would be endorsed by the Republican state convention which was due to meet at the same city on the following day. The convention was dominated by the old Hunkers/Hard faction of the Democratic Party (which had supported John C. Breckinridge for the Presidency the year before, and had been reduced to a small minority at the 1860 New York state election) and the Greeley Republicans.

The Republican state convention met on September 11 at Syracuse, New York and endorsed the Independent People's ticket with the exception of Frederick A. Tallmadge. The Republicans preferred the incumbent Canal Commissioner Benjamin F. Bruce to be re-nominated.

Results
The whole jointly nominated part of the "Union" ticket was elected, only the Democratic candidate for short-term Canal Commissioner William W. Wright was elected due to the split of the "Union" ticket.

The incumbents Floyd-Jones, Richmond, Comstock and Bruce were defeated.

22 Republicans and 10 Democrats were elected to a two-year term (1862–63) in the New York State Senate.

The New York State Assembly of 1862 was almost evenly divided between Republicans and Democrats, most of whom had been elected on the "Union" ticket. There was a small majority of Republicans.

Sources
Result in The Tribune Almanac 1862
The Union ticket:  in Harper's Weekly, September 28, 1861, pg. 611
The tickets:  in NYT on November 5, 1861 (giving "Low" instead of Lord)

Notes

See also
New York state elections

1861
 
New York
November 1861 events